Melanocercops ficuvorella is a moth of the family Gracillariidae. It is known from Guangdong, China, and from India and Japan (Shikoku, Honshū, the Amami Islands, Tusima, the Ryukyu Islands and Kyūshū).

The wingspan is 6-8.2 mm.

The larvae feed on Ficus carica, Ficus erecta, Ficus hispida, Ficus microcarpa, Ficus nipponica, Ficus pumila, Ficus virens and Ficus virgata. They probably mine the leaves of their host plant.

References

Acrocercopinae
Moths of Asia
Moths of Japan
Moths described in 1926